Trowbridge Town Football Club is a football club based in Trowbridge, Wiltshire, England.

History
A Trowbridge Town team was originally formed in 1880 and became one of the founding members of the Bristol & District League in 1892, finishing as runners-up in the league's first season. They stayed in the Bristol league for three seasons and then joined the Western League where they stayed until 1958 apart from two occasions; firstly between 1898 and 1901 when they resigned from the league, secondly 1907–1913 when they joined the Wiltshire County League. After success in the Western League, in 1958 they won promotion to the Southern League. In 1981, Trowbridge won promotion to the Football Conference (then known as the Alliance Premier League) where they played for three seasons before being relegated back to the Southern League where they remained until folding in 1998.

A new team was quickly formed and the Club joined the Wiltshire County League for the 1999–2000 season, where they won the County Intermediate League in their debut season and then joined the County Senior League following improvements to the Woodmarsh Ground. After achieving the Wiltshire League Championship and Wilts Senior Cup double in the 2003–04 season, and conducting further ground improvements, they gained promotion to the Hellenic Football League. At the end of the 2011–12 season the club was relegated from the Hellenic league to the Wiltshire League, as despite finishing bottom of the league, the relegation was voluntary as so that the club could comply with an agreement with the FA and Hellenic League Feeder leagues to relegate a bottom placed club if the facilities did not comply with the grade required.

The Bees won the Wiltshire Senior League in 2015, and have since solidified themselves as a top 4 team in the division.

In 2023, sitting top of the table and unbeaten at home in nearly 2 years, and in all major competitions in 2022/23, the club announced it had applied for promotion to Step 6.

Ground
Trowbridge Town play their home games at The Daykin Estates Ground, Axe and Cleaver Ln, Woodmarsh, Trowbridge, Wiltshire, BA14 0SA.

Previously they played at Timbrell Street, the Flower Show Field, the Bythesea Road ground from (1923 - 1934) and Frome Road (1934 - 1998). The Frome Road ground hosted greyhound racing from 1976 to 1979.

Honours

League honours
Southern League Southern Division :
 Runners-up: 1990–91
Western League Premier Division :
 Winners: 1939–40, 1946–47, 1947–48, 1955–56
 Runners-up: 1921–22, 1948–49, 1956–57
Western League Division two:
 Winners: 1927–28, 1929–30, 1938–39
 Runners-up: 1919–20
Hellenic League Division One West:
 Runners-up: 2004–05, 2006–07
Wiltshire Senior League:
 Winners: 2003–04, 2015–16
Wiltshire Intermediate League:
 Winners: 1999-2000

Cup honours
Wiltshire senior cup:
 Winners (8 Times): 1894–95, 1895–96 (shared with Swindon Town),1897–98, 1921–22, 1925–26, 1933–34, 1937–38, 2003–2004
 Runners-up(9 Times): 1886–87, 1889–90, 1892–93, 1896–97, 1906–07, 1907–08, 1912–13, 1929–30, 2002–03
 Bristol & District League:
 Runners-up: 1892–93
Western Football League Cup:
 Winners: 1956–57
Wiltshire Professional Shield:
 Winners: 1945–46, 1946–47, 1949–50, 1968–69, 1969–70, 1972–73
Western Counties Floodlit League Cup:
 Winners: 1980–81
Corsham Print Senior Cup:
 Runners-up: 2002–03, 2003–04

Records

Highest League Position: 17th in Alliance Premier League 1981-82
F.A Cup best Performance: First round 1945–46, 1947–48, 1957–58, 1963–64
F.A Trophy best Performance: First round 1970–71, 1983–84, 1986–87, 1995–96
F.A. Vase best performance: Semi-final 1990–91

Former players
 Players that have played/managed in the football league or any foreign equivalent to this level (i.e. fully professional league).
 Players with full international caps.
 Players that have achieved success in other sports or the media

David Pyle
Thomas Roberts
Rex Tilley
Colin Tavener
Jack Hallam
Ken Smith
Bernie Wright
Jesse Whatley
Ray Cashley
Tony Byrne
John Smeulders
Lewis Haldane
Peter Sampson
Alois Eisenträger
Ray Pulis
Cecil Dixon
James Vince
Alfred Gard
Steve Smith
Vic Lambden
Murray Fishlock
Miah Dennehy
Steve Harding
Pat Godfrey
Kevin Sheldon
Billy George
Lew Bradford
Ray Mabbutt
Danny Bartley
David Moss
Phil Ferns
Don Townsend
Paul Compton
Bryan Bush
John Layton
Eric Weaver
Ray Baverstock
Peter Aitken
Paul Davies
Trevor Tainton
Steve Talboys
Alan Birchenall
Richard Thompson
Roger Smart
Ken Skeen
Terry Rose

References

External links
Club site
Archive Site

Hellenic Football League
Association football clubs established in 1880
Southern Football League clubs
Trowbridge
1880 establishments in England
Football clubs in Wiltshire
Football clubs in England
Wiltshire Football League
National League (English football) clubs
Western Football League
Bristol and District Football League